André Blais (born 24 January 1947) is a Canadian political scientist who is a professor in the department of political science at the University of Montreal. At this university, he holds the University Research Chair in Electoral Studies, and formerly held two Tier I Canada Research Chairs in Electoral Studies there. He is a fellow of the Royal Society of Canada, a former president of the Canadian Political Science Association, and a former chair of the Comparative Study of Electoral Systems.

Selected works

References

External links
Faculty page

Université Laval alumni
Living people
Canadian political scientists
Academic staff of the Université de Montréal
Canada Research Chairs
Fellows of the Royal Society of Canada
People from Drummondville
York University alumni
1947 births
Presidents of the Canadian Political Science Association